This article shows a list of towns in the Costa del Sol in Andalusia, Spain.

List

A 
  Algarrobo
  Algatocín
  Alhaurín de la Torre
  Alhaurín el Grande
  Almáchar
  Almargen
  Almogía
  Álora
  Alozaina
  Alpandeire
  Antequera
  Árchez
  Archidona
  Ardales
  Arenas
  Arriate

B 
  Benadalid
  Benahavís
  Benalauría
  Benalmádena
  Benamargosa
  Benamocarra
  Benaoján
  Benarrabá
  El Borge
  El Burgo

C 
  (Sitio de) Calahonda
  Campillos
  Canillas del Aceituno
  Canillas de Albaida
  Cañete La Real
  Carratraca
  Cartajima
  Cártama
  Casabermeja
  Casarabonela
  Casares
  Coín
  Colmenar
  Comares
  Cómpeta
  Cortes de la Frontera
  Cuevas Bajas
  Cuevas de San Marcos
  Cuevas del Becerro
  Cútar

E 
  Estepona

F 
  Faraján
  Frigiliana
  Fuengirola
  Fuente de Piedra

G 
  Gaucín
  Genalguacil
  Guaro

H 

  Humilladero

I 
  Igualeja
  Istán
  Iznate

J 
  Jimera de Líbar
  Jubrique
  Júzcar

L 
  La Cala de Mijas
  La Viñuela

M 
  Macharaviaya
  Málaga (Capital)
  Manilva
  Marbella
  Mijas
  Moclinejo
  Mollina
  Monda
  Montejaque

N 
  Nerja

O 
  Ojén

P 
  Parauta
  Periana
  Pizarra
  Pujerra

R 
  Rincón de la Victoria
  Riogordo
  Ronda

S 
  Safiya
  Sayalonga
  Sedella
  Sierra de Yeguas
  San Pedro de Alcántara

T 
  Teba
  Tolox
  Torremolinos
  Torrox
  Totalán

V 
  Valle de Abdalajís
  Vélez-Málaga
  Villanueva de Algaidas
  Villanueva de la Concepción
  Villanueva de Tapia
  Villanueva del Rosario
  Villanueva del Trabuco

Y 
  Yunquera

Populated places in the Province of Málaga
Seaside resorts in Spain